PlanMember Securities Corporation (commonly referred to as PlanMember) was founded in 1982 and is considered one of the 25 largest independent broker-dealers. As of 2020, the company had more than 479 financial advisors, over $14 billion in advisory & brokerage assets, and generated approximately $143.0 million in annual revenue for the 2021 fiscal year.

PlanMember Financial was formed in 1982 to provide educators with the level of service and investment choices available to many corporate retirement plan employees. The company has expanded its financial services through 40 US-based financial centers and 480 independent financial advisors. PlanMember is headquartered in Carpinteria, CA. 

PlanMember's subsidiaries are PlanMember Services, PlanMember Services, PlanMember Financial Corporation, and PSC Insurance Marketing Corporation.

Statistics
Key facts regarding PlanMember include the following:

 IBD Elite Top 50 independent broker/dealers

 461 financial representatives

 Approximately 4,500 technology, custody, and clearing service subscribers

 $16.6 billion in advisory and brokerage assets as of April 2022

Legal
On March 11, 2019, 79 firms agreed to a $125 million industry settlement arising from Firms 12b-1 fees fund sale violations. PlanMember to return $3.5 million to clients.

References

External links
Official site
Financial Advisor site

Financial services companies of the United States
Financial services companies based in California
Financial services companies established in 1982
1982 establishments in California